Gans is an unincorporated community in Fayette County, Pennsylvania, United States. Gans has a post office, with ZIP code 15439, located on Gans Road inside Burchinal's General Store.

References

Unincorporated communities in Fayette County, Pennsylvania
Unincorporated communities in Pennsylvania